HMAS Arunta (FFH 151) is an Anzac-class frigate of the Royal Australian Navy (RAN). The ship, named for the Arrernte people, was laid down in 1995 and commissioned in 1998. Since entering service, Arunta has performed a wide range of duties, including border protection patrols in northern Australian waters, and several deployments to the Persian Gulf.

Design and construction

The Anzac class originated from RAN plans to replace the six River-class destroyer escorts with a mid-capability patrol frigate. The Australian shipbuilding industry was thought to be incapable of warship design, so the RAN decided to take a proven foreign design and modify it. Around the same time, the Royal New Zealand Navy (RNZN) was looking to replace four Leander-class frigates; a deterioration in New Zealand-United States relations, the need to improve alliances with nearby nations, and the commonalities between the RAN and RNZN ships' requirements led the two nations to begin collaborating on the acquisition in 1987. Tenders were requested by the Anzac Ship Project at the end of 1986, with 12 ship designs (including an airship) submitted. By August 1987, the tenders were narrowed down in October to Blohm + Voss's MEKO 200 design, the M class (later Karel Doorman class) offered by Royal Schelde, and a scaled-down Type 23 frigate proposed by Yarrow Shipbuilders. In 1989, the Australian government announced that Melbourne-based shipbuilder AMECON (which became Tenix Defence) would build the modified MEKO 200 design. The Australians ordered eight ships, while New Zealand ordered two, with an unexercised option for two more.

The Anzacs are based on Blohm + Voss' MEKO 200 PN (or Vasco da Gama class) frigates, modified to meet Australian and New Zealand specifications and maximise the use of locally built equipment. Each frigate has a  full load displacement. A Combined Diesel or Gas (CODOG) propulsion machinery layout is used, with a single,  General Electric LM2500-30 gas turbine and two  MTU 12V1163 TB83 diesel engines driving the ship's two controllable-pitch propellers. The standard ship's company of an Anzac consists of 22 officers and 141 sailors.

As designed, the main armament for the frigate is a 5-inch 54 calibre Mark 45 gun, supplemented by an eight-cell Mark 41 vertical launch system (for RIM-7 Sea Sparrow or RIM-162 Evolved Sea Sparrow missiles), two  machine guns, and two Mark 32 triple torpedo tube sets (initially firing Mark 46 torpedoes, but later upgraded to use the MU90 Impact torpedo). They were also designed for but not with a close-in weapons system (two Mini Typhoons fitted when required from 2005 onwards), two quad-canister Harpoon anti-ship missile launchers (which were installed across the RAN vessels from 2005 onwards), and a second Mark 41 launcher (which has not been added). The Australian Anzacs use a Sikorsky S-70B-2 Seahawk helicopter; plans to replace them with Kaman SH-2G Super Seasprites were cancelled in 2008 due to ongoing problems.

Arunta was laid down at Williamstown, Victoria on 22 July 1995. The ship was assembled from six hull modules and six superstructure modules; the superstructure modules were fabricated in Whangarei, New Zealand, and hull modules were built at both Williamstown and Newcastle, New South Wales, with final integration at Williamstown. She was launched on 28 June 1996 by Dulce Morrow, wife of the first commanding officer of the first Arunta. The ship was commissioned on 12 December 1998. The spelling of the ship's name is not consistent with that used by the Arrernte people, who the previous ship was named after; correcting it was considered, but the RAN decided to use the same spelling as the previous ship. Had the New Zealand government exercised their option for two more frigates, Arunta was one of the ships that would have been designated for the RNZN.

Operational history
In September 2001, Arunta deployed to northern Australian waters in the wake of the Tampa affair. The ship participated in Operation Gaberdine and Operation Relex in two separate deployments. During the second deployment Arunta was involved in the interception and/or return of Suspected Illegal Entry Vessels (SIEV) 6, 7, and 9.

In 2002, Arunta saw active service for the first time when she participated as part of the third rotation of RAN ships to the Persian Gulf as part of Operation Slipper. The ship was involved in the enforcement of United Nations sanctions against Iraq, and at the time operated closer to the Iraqi coast than any other ship of the International Coalition Against Terrorism force. The ship's boarding parties effected 377 boardings during her four months on station.

On 12 November 2007, Arunta deployed for her second tour of active service in the Persian Gulf, as part of Operation Catalyst. The ship's role was to contribute to the protection of Iraqi oil platforms, security boardings of all vessels proceeding to the platforms and training of the Iraqi Navy. The ship returned from this deployment on 11 May 2008.

On 19 December 2008, Arunta was dispatched from Fremantle to rescue injured yachtsman Yann Elies, who was participating in the Vendée Globe, a solo round-the-world yacht race.

Following an overhaul of the RAN battle honours system, completed in March 2010, Arunta was retroactively awarded the honour "Persian Gulf 2001–02".

In June 2014, modifications to Arunta as part of the Anti-Ship Missile Defence Project upgrade were completed. Arunta was the second ship of the class to be upgraded, with the installation of a CEAFAR Phased Array Radar and an upgraded SAAB Combat Management System, among other modifications, during an 18-month refit. The ship commenced post-refit sea trials at the end of June.

In July 2017 the Arunta was deployed in the Middle East for nine months as part of Operation Manitou. Arunta was the first vessel in the RAN to conduct an extended patrol in the region and the 64th Australian vessel deployed to the region since 1990. During November 2020 the ship took part in efforts to enforce sanctions against North Korea as part of Operation Argos.

Citations

References
Books

Journal articles

News articles

Press releases

Other sources

Anzac-class frigates of the Royal Australian Navy
Naval ships of Australia
1996 ships
Military Units in Western Australia